Lionello Puppi (22 December 1931 – 15 September 2018) was an Italian art historian and politician.

A native of Belluno born in 1931, he later moved to Conegliano. He began teaching at the University of Padua in 1971. He left for the Ca' Foscari University of Venice in 1991, and retired as professor emeritus in 2005.

He represented the Italian Communist Party in the Senate from 1985 to 1987, replacing , who died in office. Puppi died in Treviso at the age of 86 on 15 September 2018.

References

1931 births
2018 deaths
Italian art historians
20th-century Italian historians
21st-century Italian historians
Senators of Legislature IX of Italy
Italian Communist Party politicians
People from Belluno
Academic staff of the University of Padua
People from Conegliano
Academic staff of the Ca' Foscari University of Venice
Italian male non-fiction writers
20th-century Italian male writers